Damian Tsekenis (born 16 April 2001), is an Australian professional footballer who plays as a forward.

Personal life
Damian was born to a Greek-descent father - Peter Tsekenis who was a professional football player.

References

External links

Living people
Australian soccer players
Association football midfielders
Central Coast Mariners FC players
National Premier Leagues players
A-League Men players
Australian people of Greek descent
2001 births